Maranthirkku Pinbu Helan is a 2018 Tamil drama film starring Vijay Annis,Kamali, Nagina and Kalam Arunachalam.
It is a block-buster Horror movie, Directed by Sivakumar and Music Directed by Isai Aruvi Thomas Rathnam.

Plot
The story begins with a young lovers. Due to the social bitterness the young lovers desperate and commit suicide. Heroine become a spirit and looks revenge.
It's  a heart throbbing love with sentiments and comedy subject.

Cast

 Vijay Annis as Hero
 Kamali as Heroine
 Kalam Arunachalam as Comedian

Production
Silver Touch India Produced this film

Release
This film is shot in dual language as Tamil and Malayalam. Dubbed in Telugu.

Soundtrack
	

The soundtrack was composed by "Isai Aruvi Thomas Rathnam "while the lyrics for all the songs were written by Arrupukottai Thavasimani, Bharathan, Madumathi,Vaanam and Thomas Rathnam.

References

External links
 www.silvertouchindia.com

2018 films
2010s Tamil-language films
Indian drama films
2018 drama films